Abdullah Malik Anderson Jr. (born January 24, 1996) is an American football defensive tackle for the Atlanta Falcons of the National Football League (NFL). He played college football at Bucknell. Anderson signed with the Chicago Bears as an undrafted free agent in 2018 and spent three seasons with them before playing with several other NFL teams.

Early life
Anderson was born in Atlantic City, New Jersey, on January 24, 1996. He grew up in nearby Galloway Township and attended Absegami High School. He is the only son of Abdullah Anderson Sr. and Octavia Anderson. Anderson has one older sister, Amira.

College career
Anderson attended Bucknell, where he majored in Economics. As a freshman, he started all 11 games at defensive tackle; he was one of five defensive players to start every game and the only freshman on team to do so.<ref name="Bucknell bio"

During his second year in 2015, Anderson was one of six defensive players to start all 11 games and one of three defensive linemen to start every game. He totaled 46 tackles, eight tackles for loss, 4.5 sacks and three pass breakups from defensive tackle position. He ranked seventh on team in tackles and fifth on squad in tackles for loss.

In his junior season, Anderson started all 11 games on the defensive line for a third straight year. He ranked fourth on team with 55 tackles, 13.5 tackles for loss, five pass breakups and two blocked kicks. Anderson ranked second in Patriot League in tackles for loss and ranked third in Patriot League in sacks. He was named Patriot League Defensive Player of the Week on November 21 after totaling five tackles, 3.5 tackles for loss, 2.5 sacks, one pass breakup and two blocked field goals against Fordham.

During his senior year in 2017, Anderson recorded 42 tackles, nine tackles for loss, 2.5 sacks, two fumble recoveries, an interception, and blocked an extra point. In addition to being named All-Patriot League for the fourth time, he was named the 2017 Patriot League Defensive Player of the Year and NCAA FCS Collegiate Player of the Year by the Brooks-Irvine Memorial Football Club. He was also named second-team All-American by the Associated Press.

Anderson ended his college career with 43 starts in which he had 171 tackles, 33.5 tackles for loss, 15.5 sacks, and a school-record four blocked kicks.

Professional career

Chicago Bears
Before the 2018 NFL Draft, Anderson participated in private workouts with the San Francisco 49ers and Seattle Seahawks. After not being selected in the draft, he signed with the Chicago Bears as an undrafted free agent. He was released during final roster cuts and signed to the team's practice squad. He remained with the team for the 2019 offseason after signing a future/reserve contract.

Anderson made the 2019 Bears' final roster and played in his maiden NFL game in the season opener against the Green Bay Packers. He was waived on September 11 and moved to the practice squad to make room for tight end J. P. Holtz, but was promoted to the active roster on September 23 to increase defensive line depth following Bilal Nichols' injury. He was waived on September 30 and re-signed to the team's practice squad on October 1. He was promoted to the 53-man roster again on October 14 after Kyle Long was placed on injured reserve.

In the third quarter of the Bears' 36–25 loss to the New Orleans Saints on October 20, 2019, Anderson recorded his first career NFL sack on Teddy Bridgewater. In addition to his sack, Anderson had a tackle for loss and two total tackles.

Anderson was among the final roster cuts on September 5, 2020, before being placed on the practice squad a day later. He was released on September 14.

Minnesota Vikings
On September 21, 2020, Anderson was signed to the Minnesota Vikings' practice squad. He was elevated to the active roster on November 7 for the team's week 9 game against the Detroit Lions, and reverted to the practice squad after the game. His practice squad contract with the team expired after the season on January 11, 2021.

Pittsburgh Steelers
Anderson signed with the Pittsburgh Steelers on April 12, 2021. He was waived on August 17, 2021.

Green Bay Packers
On August 25, 2021, Anderson signed with the Green Bay Packers.
On August 31, 2021, Packers released Anderson as part of their final roster cuts. He was signed to the practice squad the next day. He was released on September 21, 2021.

Tennessee Titans
On September 29, 2021, Anderson was signed to the Tennessee Titans practice squad. He was released on October 26.

Green Bay Packers (second stint)
On November 2, 2021, Anderson was signed to the Green Bay Packers practice squad. He was elevated to the active roster on December 18 ahead of a week 15 game against Baltimore Ravens. He was elevated to the active roster again on January 1, 2022, ahead of a Week 17 game against the Minnesota Vikings. He was elevated to the active roster the third time on January 8, 2022, ahead of a Week 18 game against the Detroit Lions.

Atlanta Falcons
On August 7, 2022, Anderson signed with the Atlanta Falcons.On September 1, 2022, Anderson was signed to the 53 man roster for the Falcons.  The Falcons released Anderson on September 10, 2022, a day before the start of the 2022 season. He was signed to the practice squad two days later. He was promoted to the active roster on September 19.

Washington Commanders
Anderson signed with the Washington Commanders on March 17, 2023.

Career NFL statistics

Regular season

References

External links
Washington Commanders bio
Bucknell Bison bio

Living people
1996 births
Absegami High School alumni
People from Galloway Township, New Jersey
Players of American football from New Jersey
Sportspeople from Atlantic City, New Jersey
Bucknell Bison football players
American football defensive tackles
Chicago Bears players
Minnesota Vikings players
Pittsburgh Steelers players
Green Bay Packers players
Tennessee Titans players
Atlanta Falcons players
Washington Commanders players